Daphnella corbula is a species of sea snail, a marine gastropod mollusk in the family Raphitomidae.

Description
The length of the shell attains 3.8 mm, its diameter 1.75 mm.

Distribution

References

  Thiele J., 1925. Gastropoden der Deutschen Tiefsee-Expedition. In:. Wissenschaftliche Ergebnisse der Deutschen Tiefsee-Expedition auf dem Dampfer "Valdivia" 1898–1899  II. Teil, vol. 17, No. 2, Gustav Fischer, Berlin

External links
 

corbula
Gastropods described in 1925